is a Japanese actress and voice actress who was previously represented by Sunaoka Office but now works for mitt management. Prior to becoming a voice actress, she worked mainly on stage. Her specialities are classical ballet, jazz dance, and tap dance. Before she started as a voice actress, she was a stage actress and has been voicing radio dramas since 2007.

Her biggest roles were as starring characters Violet Evergarden in Violet Evergarden and as Mikasa Ackerman in Attack on Titan. She also voices China Kousaka in Gundam Build Fighters, Sayuri Haruno in Bonjour Sweet Love Patisserie, Hinaki Shinjo in Aikatsu, and YoRHa No.2 Type B (2B) in Nier: Automata. At the 8th Seiyu Awards in 2014, she won an award for Best Supporting Actress. She also won the award for Best Actress in a Leading Role at the 15th Annual Seiyū Awards in 2021 for her role in Violet Evergarden.

She has attended anime conventions around the world, including Sakura-Con in Seattle, Otakuthon in Montreal, and Japan Expo in Paris, and Madman Anime Festival in Brisbane.

Biography
Ishikawa was 6 years old when she joined the theatre company, Himawari in Osaka while commuting to school when she was a student. She appears in performances within the theatre company every year, and since coming to Tokyo, she has appeared in musical class performances and main performances.

When she was in elementary school, Ishikawa entered the performance live, "Dream Quest" sponsored by the theatre company as a duo, and performed songs and dances. From junior high school, Ishikawa has starred in many of the theatre company's masterpiece musical series. In September 2005, when she was in the first year of high school, she transferred to the Sunaoka office of the Himawari Theatre Group.

In 2007, she made her anime debut as Dianeira in the TV anime Heroic Age.

In April 2013, she became a member of the "A & G Girls Project" at Nippon Cultural Broadcasting Super! A & G +. The unit name is "Trefle". In the same year, after the TV anime Attack on Titan started broadcasting and there were more opportunities to be featured in various related events. She also appeared in overseas events.

In 2014, she won the Best Actress in supporting roles at the 8th Seiyu Awards. On March 30, she held her first solo talk at Hotel New Otani Osaka in the same year. Ishikawa's official website was opened on November 27th.

In November 2016, the activity as "Trefle" was finished. Part of the live final and the feedback for each person was delivered on November 18, 2016, on Nico Nico Live Broadcasting "Second Shot Night" and "Trefle-TV" (final episode).

In 2019, there was a dedicated official site "Yui Ishikawa official site", but the site was closed by the end of 2018. In the future, it will be written and announced on the TOP page of the office, the profile column, or the blog.

On April 30, 2019, she announced her departure from the Sunaoka office on her blog. Ishikawa belonged to the Himawari Theatre Group for 23 and a half years.

On May 10, 2019, it was announced that she had joined "mitt management" at the same time as opening her official Twitter.

On November 19, 2019, information on Yui Ishikawa's solo project "UTA-KATA" was released. A music reading drama project planned by Shigeru Saito of Heart Company Co., Ltd., "Yui Ishikawa UTA-KATA Vol.1 ~ Dawn's Ginyu Poet ~" was held in 3 cities and 6 performances from January 11, 2020. Along with the piano performance by Masumi Itō, the story was read aloud by Kana Akatsuki and the original song for this work was performed.

On May 5, 2020, the mitt management submitted a damage report to the police because of the continuous threatening posts to "harm" Ishikawa herself, her family, and the office. A man who had posted an online threat on June 1, 2020, was arrested.

On March 6, 2021, she won the Best Actress in a Leading Role at the 15th Seiyu Awards.

On May 30, 2021, she announced her marriage on her 32nd birthday.

Filmography

Anime

Original video animation

Film

Video games

Radio and audio

Dubbing roles

Awards and prizes

References

External links 
  
 Official agency profile 
 
 
 

1989 births
Living people
Japanese child actresses
Japanese musical theatre actresses
Japanese video game actresses
Japanese voice actresses
Seiyu Award winners
Voice actresses from Hyōgo Prefecture
21st-century Japanese actresses